Bianca Doria (22 September 1915 – 2 February 1985) was an Italian actress. She appeared in more than forty films during her career. She appeared in the 1963 peplum Hercules Against the Mongols. She was married to director Alberto Doria.

Following the overthrow of Benito Mussolini's government in 1943 she and her husband went to work in the film industry of the pro-German Italian Social Republic in Venice, for which she was criticized after the Second World War ended.

Selected filmography

 Short Circuit (1943)
 Stormbound (1950)
 Tomorrow Is Another Day (1951)
 Vacation with a Gangster (1951)
 The Last Sentence (1951)
 Deceit (1952)
 Drama on the Tiber (1952)
 For You I Have Sinned (1953)
 The World Condemns Them (1953)
 Guai ai vinti (1954)
 The Awakening (1956)
 The Dragon's Blood (1957)
 The Trojan Horse (1961)
 Hercules Against the Mongols (1963)
 Brief Season (1969)
 The Hassled Hooker (1972)
 Seven Deaths in the Cat's Eye (1973)

References

Bibliography
 Hughes, Howard. Cinema Italiano: The Complete Guide from Classics to Cult. I.B. Tauris, 2011.

External links

 
 Biography of Bianca Doria 

1915 births
1985 deaths
People from the Province of Belluno
Italian film actresses